Power Lords – The Extra-Terrestrial Warriors is a science fiction-themed action figure line produced by Revell in 1983. Revell hired Wayne Barlowe (author/artist of Barlowe's Guide to Extraterrestrials) to design the toys.

Each figure has an action feature. Adam Power can change into Lord Power by pushing a button to turn his torso around to reveal the Lord Power side; Shaya is a two-sided figure who is changed by turning her cape around and removing her helmet; Arkus's wings flap.

The figurines were unique in that they were not based on an existing comic book series. DC Comics published a 3-issue Power Lords comic book series beginning in December 1983. A video game, board game, jigsaw puzzle and coloring book based on the characters were also released that same year.

In September 2021, The Nacelle Company, known for their documentary series The Toys That Made Us, acquired the Power Lords brand with their intention to make new toys, comic books and animated series in the foreseeable future.

In September 2022, Nacelle announced that the pre-orders for the new Power Lords figures would start on October 11. However, as of November 7, 2022, no updates were made on the delay of the pre-orders.

List of 1980's Power Lords figures  
1) Lord Adam Power (the main hero, leader of the Power Lords, from the planet Earth)

2) Arkus (the main villain, the evil dictator, born from a red sun)

3) Shaya (the Queen of Power, from the planet Meru)

4) Sydot (known as "the supreme", from the water planet "Rana")

5) Raygoth (the goon of doom, from the frozen plane of Flozar VIII)

6) Ggripptogg (the four fisted brute, from the planet Ferrikon)

7) Backattack (the brutal backstabber, from war plane Militron)

8) Disguyzor (the deadly deceiver, from the Growton planet)

9) Drrench (the savage soaker, from the Frigidor planet)

10) Tork (the turning terror, from the planet known as Twearth)

List of Power Lords: Beast Machines 
Power Lords: Beast Machines was a sub-group of Power Lords toys released during the 1980s. These Power Lords: Beast Machines are large Power Lords where the upper half of their body is either human or a humanoid type alien and the lower half of their body is a tank. They are half human (or humanoid) and half tank.

1) Savor

2) Evol

3) Warbot

4) Thrash

DC comic's Power Lords mini-series 
Released during December 1983 and ending by early 1984, DC comics released a three issue mini-series based on the Power Lords line of toys.

Issue # 1:

Titled "To The Victor, The Universe".

Shaya, the queen of power, flies to Earth in her ship to encounter Adam Lord, who is unaware that he is not really an earthling, but is really a POWER LORD. Adam's amnesia goes away as he remembers everything about himself and also remembers Arkus, the evil dictator. Both Shaya and Adam Power are attacked by two of Arkus' henchmen (Raygoth and Ggriptogg). While Adam and Shaya defeat both the henchmen, Arkus shows up and defeats both of them. Adam Power and Shaya are defeated. The evil dictator Arkus is victorious.

Issue # 2:

Titled "The Dimension of Doom"

Arkus continues to blast Adam Power and Shaya and teleports them to the Dimension of Doom. Adam Power and Shaya meet Sydot the supreme, a humanoid type dino alien. Sydot is determined to get out of the dimension and Adam and Shaya accompany him on his escape. They fight off monsters and Adam and Sydot enter an uneasy alliance with each other as Shaya is the "glue" that holds them together, and multiple additional battles with enemy forces happen after they escape the dimension using a ship. By the end of the second issue, Adam Power's super powered abilities are fully powered up.

Issue # 3

Titled "All hail Arkus, Lord of the Galaxy"

A fully power up and transformed Adam Power flies through space as both Shaya and Sydot are in their ship, all flying towards the base of Arkus the dictator. When they arrive, Shaya and Sydot beat up some of the guards of Arkus and Arkus is in his assembly chamber giving a speech to all his minions. Arkus operates "the Volcan Rock", a huge base, which he uses to blow up an entire populated planet to show his dominance. Lord Adam Power flies in and starts attacking the minions as Arkus gets a hold of Shaya and Sydot and holds them hostage as an angry Adam Power threatens him. After Adam fights off an armada of additional minions, Adam finally starts fighting Arkus, blasts him and thrashes him with his fists and Arkus is finally defeated. As a last act of vengeance and revenge, Adam Power (with Shaya and Sydot) banish Arkus and Raygoth and Ggripptogg and other evil minions to another dimension, where they cannot escape. Lord Adam Power is victorious.

Power Lords: The Video Game for the Magnavox Odyssey 2  
The Power Lords video game was advertised in the third issue of the Power Lords comic during February 1984 and was releasing during a time period in video game history when the great video game crash was in full swing and the Magnavox Odyssey 2 video game system was in its final days. An extremely limited amount of copies were sold and it is considered one of the rarest video games of its generation and the rarest game on the Magnavox Odyssey 2. It is considered the holy grail of the Magnavox Odyssey 2 video game system due to its rarity and is considered a very good game as some retro video game review sites have scored it a 4.3 out of 5. While it is a single screen shooter / Shmup, it is not a clone of Space Invaders or any other game. You freely fly a ship (the same ship that is seen in the Power Lords comic book series) around Volcan Rock (the evil planet destroying base of Arkus the evil dictator) and try to shoot the large snake which will fire laser beams at your ship if you fail to dodge its attacks. Also, volcanic eruptions also occur, which the player must watch out for.

There were also Atari 2600 and Colecovision versions of the Power Lords video game made, but the versions of the game for these two video game systems were never officially released. Only the Magnavox Odyssey 2 version of the Power Lords video game was released to the public at retail stores.

Relaunch
In late 2012, toy sculptors Four Horsemen Studios announced they had acquired the license to produce new Power Lords action figures. Using the Glyos joints created by Onell Design, the new Power Lords figures were first released at SDCC in 2013 but were cancelled after failing to reach preorder targets. Another version was announced in 2017 and debuted at ComicCon, however their current status is unknown.

References

1980s toys
Comics by Michael Fleisher
DC Comics titles
Science fiction comics
Action figures